Tower Peak is a mountain in the Sierra Nevada of Mono and Tuolumne County, California. 

To the south of the summit is Yosemite National Park and to the north is the Hoover Wilderness. Mary Lake is to the west, Ehrnbeck Peak and Hawksbeak Peak to the east. To the south are Wells Peak and Craig Peak. The next higher mountain is Eagle Peak, about 8 mi east-northeast.

Climate
Tower Peak is located in an alpine climate zone. Most weather fronts originate in the Pacific Ocean, and travel east toward the Sierra Nevada mountains. As fronts approach, they are forced upward by the peaks (orographic lift), causing them to drop their moisture in the form of rain or snowfall onto the range.

References

Mountains of the Sierra Nevada (United States)
Mountains of Mono County, California
Mountains of Tuolumne County, California
Mountains of Northern California
North American 3000 m summits